The women's 400 metres event  at the 1982 European Athletics Indoor Championships was held on 6–7 March.

Medalists

Results

Heats
First 2 of each heat (Q) and the next 2 fastest (q) qualified for the semifinals.

Semifinals
First 2 from each semifinal qualified directly (Q) for the final.

Final

References

400 metres at the European Athletics Indoor Championships
400